Dasia semicincta, also known as southern keel-scaled tree skink and Peters' dasia, is a species of skink found in Mindanao, the Philippines (possibly wider) and in Sarawak, Borneo (Malaysia).

References

semicincta
Reptiles of Malaysia
Reptiles of the Philippines
Reptiles of Borneo
Reptiles described in 1867
Taxa named by Wilhelm Peters